The women's shot put event at the 1970 British Commonwealth Games was held on 23 July at the Meadowbank Stadium in Edinburgh, Scotland.

Results

References

Athletics at the 1970 British Commonwealth Games
1970